Douglas Patrick Haig (March 9, 1920 – February 1, 2011) was an American child actor appearing in films in the 1920s and 1930s. His career began at age two in silent films and (unlike many silent film actors) continued into sound films ("talkies").

From 1928 onward he appeared in at least 14 films. As a small child he was placid and pleasant-looking. In a scholarly review of Attorney for the Defense, a 1932 sound film, his performance is described as very annoying. The high point of Haig's career as a film actor came in 1935, with a starring role in Man's Best Friend (1935).

Before this he had appeared in both feature films and shorts such as The Family Group (1928), Sins of the Fathers (1928 lost silent film, of which only excerpts survive at the UCLA Film and Television Archives), Betrayal (1929, a silent film with talking sequences, synchronized music and sound effects), and Welcome Danger (1929).

In Man's Best Friend (1935), he starred in the lead role of Jed Strong, a boy whose abusive father wants to kill his dog. In 1986, TV Guide described the film as a “simple, unpretentious story of a little mountain boy and his pet police dog”.

Although some early films in which Haig appeared have been lost, the later film survive and of those a few have been released on DVD. These include Man's Best Friend (together with The Secret Code) and High Gear.

Filmography

References

External links
 

1920 births
2011 deaths
American male child actors
American male film actors
American male silent film actors
Male actors from New Orleans
20th-century American male actors